This is a list of mosques in Ulcinj, Montenegro (Albanian: Ulqin).

Present mosques

Former mosques 

 
Ulcinj
Mosques in Ulcinj